Roland Gransart (born 1 January 1954 in Marseille, France) is a French former footballer and coach.

He played for Olympique de Marseille.

After his playing career, he became a coach with Olympique de Marseille, SC Bastia, FC Gueugnon, AS Cannes and FC Martigues.

His father was Maurice Gransart.

External links and references

Player profile
Manager profile

1954 births
Footballers from Marseille
Living people
French footballers
Olympique de Marseille players
Ligue 1 players
French football managers
Olympique de Marseille managers
SC Bastia managers
FC Gueugnon managers
FC Martigues managers
Association football defenders